Caloptilia pedina is a moth of the family Gracillariidae and is found in Queensland, Australia.

References

pedina
Moths of Australia
Moths described in 1923